Jan Shabro (born 1940) is a former American politician who served as a member of the Washington House of Representatives from 2003 to 2007.  She represented Washington's 31st legislative district as a Republican.  Before serving in the legislature, she was a member of the Pierce County Council from 1994 to 2002.

References

1940 births
Living people
Republican Party members of the Washington House of Representatives
Women state legislators in Washington (state)